In mathematics, a stacky curve is an object in algebraic geometry that is roughly an algebraic curve with potentially "fractional points" called stacky points. A stacky curve is a type of stack used in studying Gromov–Witten theory, enumerative geometry, and rings of modular forms.

Stacky curves are deeply related to 1-dimensional orbifolds and therefore sometimes called orbifold curves or orbicurves.

Definition
A stacky curve  over a field  is a smooth proper geometrically connected Deligne–Mumford stack of dimension 1 over  that contains a dense open subscheme.

Properties
A stacky curve is uniquely determined (up to isomorphism) by its coarse space  (a smooth quasi-projective curve over ), a finite set of points  (its stacky points) and integers  (its ramification orders) greater than 1.

A stacky curve is called spherical if  is positive, Euclidean if  is zero, and hyperbolic if  is negative.

Although the corresponding statement of Riemann–Roch theorem does not hold for stacky curves, there is a generalization of Riemann's existence theorem that gives an equivalence of categories between the category of stacky curves over the complex numbers and the category of complex orbifold curves.

Applications
The generalization of GAGA for stacky curves is used in the derivation of algebraic structure theory of rings of modular forms.

The study of stacky curves is used extensively in equivariant Gromov–Witten theory and enumerative geometry.

References

Moduli theory